Helcystogramma hoplophorum is a moth in the family Gelechiidae. It was described by Edward Meyrick in 1916. It is known from India, Sri Lanka, and Myanmar.

The wingspan is about 9 mm. The forewings are bronzy brown with violet-blue-metallic markings, somewhat edged with dark fuscous and with a streak along the costa from the base to beyond one-third, thence obliquely downwards to below the middle of the disc. There is a subdorsal streak from the base of the dorsum to beyond one-third and a transverse irregular streak at three-fifths. The costal extremity is white, the ground colour beyond this wholly dark fuscous. There is also an irregular waved streak just before the termen. The hindwings are dark fuscous.

References

Moths described in 1916
hoplophorum
Moths of Asia